The European Interoperability Framework (EIF) is a set of recommendations which specify how administrations, businesses and citizens communicate with each other within the European Union and across Member State borders.

The EIF 1.0 was issued under the Interoperable Delivery of European eGovernment Services to public Administrations, Businesses and Citizens programme (IDABC). The EIF continues under the new ISA programme, which replaced the IDABC programme on 31 December 2009.

EIF in effect is an Enterprise architecture framework targeted at the largest possible scale, designed to promote integration spanning multiple sovereign Nation States, specifically EU Member States.

For further examples of Enterprise Architecture frameworks designed operate at different levels of scale, see also Alternative Enterprise Architecture Frameworks

Versions

EIF Version 1.0
EIF Version 1.0 was published in November 2004.

Further non-technology obstacles that stand in the way of greater EIF adoption include the facts that EU Member States currently differ widely in terms of:
 Scope of government - services provided, degree of state ownership of businesses, scale of armed forces, police and border control operations
 Structure of government - central/local government balance, what departments exist, how departments interact
 Citizen/state interaction models - processes related to key life events (births, marriages, deaths), document issue procedures, support for foreign languages

EIF Version 2
Draft Version 2 of the EIF was the subject of a political debate, where the main technology/commercial issues relate to the role of lobbying for proprietary software.

EIF 2 was adopted by the European Commission as the Annex II - EIF (European Interoperability Framework) of the Communication “Towards interoperability for European public services” on 16 December 2010.

'New EIF'
On 23 March 2017, the ISA2 programme released a new version of EIF. This version dropped version numbers and is simply called 'new EIF' and should include policy changes of the past years.

See also
 Semantic Interoperability Centre Europe

References

External links 
 Documentation on the European Interoperability Framework 1.0 and Draft version of 2.0
 Documentation on the European Interoperability Framework

Information society and the European Union
Interoperability